János Adorján (October 30, 1938 in Budapest – December 15, 1995 in Budapest) is a former Hungarian handball player who competed in the 1972 Summer Olympics.

In 1972 he was part of the Hungarian team which finished eighth in the Olympic tournament. He played all six matches and scored one goal.

References
 sports-reference

1938 births
1995 deaths
Hungarian male handball players
Olympic handball players of Hungary
Handball players at the 1972 Summer Olympics
Handball players from Budapest
20th-century Hungarian people